Polydesmus  is a genus of millipedes in the family Polydesmidae.

Species
Species within this genus include:

 Polydesmus abchasius
 Polydesmus abstrusus
 Polydesmus aegyptiacus
 Polydesmus alatus
 Polydesmus albocarinatus
 Polydesmus almassyi
 Polydesmus alternatus
 Polydesmus alutaceus
 Polydesmus angustus
 Polydesmus annectens
 Polydesmus arcticollis
 Polydesmus areatus
 Polydesmus armatus
 Polydesmus astenestatus
 Polydesmus asthenestatus
 Polydesmus ater
 Polydesmus barberii
 Polydesmus bataviae
 Polydesmus beaumontii
 Polydesmus beroni
 Polydesmus bogotensis
 Polydesmus bonikus
 Polydesmus brachydesmoides
 Polydesmus brevimanus
 Polydesmus bureschi
 Polydesmus caesius
 Polydesmus callipus
 Polydesmus capensis
 Polydesmus carneus
 Polydesmus cavernarum
 Polydesmus cerrrutti
 Polydesmus cerrutii
 Polydesmus chloropus
 Polydesmus clarazianus
 Polydesmus clavator
 Polydesmus claviger
 Polydesmus coarctatus
 Polydesmus codicillus
 Polydesmus cognatus
 Polydesmus collaris
 Polydesmus complananatus
 Polydesmus complanatus
 Polydesmus concolor
 Polydesmus concordiae
 Polydesmus conspersus
 Polydesmus coriaceus
 Polydesmus costobocensis
 Polydesmus crassicutis
 Polydesmus cruciator
 Polydesmus csikii
 Polydesmus cyprius
 Polydesmus dadayanus
 Polydesmus dadayi
 Polydesmus dealbatus
 Polydesmus decolor
 Polydesmus decoratus
 Polydesmus dentatus
 Polydesmus denticulatus
 Polydesmus dilatatus
 Polydesmus dorsalis
 Polydesmus dumitrescui
 Polydesmus edentulus
 Polydesmus effulgens
 Polydesmus ehrenbergii
 Polydesmus elchowensis
 Polydesmus elegans
 Polydesmus elochwensis
 Polydesmus emirganensis
 Polydesmus ensiger
 Polydesmus erichsoni
 Polydesmus escherichi
 Polydesmus escherichii
 Polydesmus falcifer
 Polydesmus fallax
 Polydesmus fischeri
 Polydesmus fissilobus
 Polydesmus flavomarginatus
 Polydesmus fontium
 Polydesmus fontius
 Polydesmus fraterus
 Polydesmus frauenfeldianus
 Polydesmus frondivagus
 Polydesmus fumigatus
 Polydesmus funiculus
 Polydesmus fuscus
 Polydesmus gabonicus
 Polydesmus gallicus
 Polydesmus gayanus
 Polydesmus genuensis
 Polydesmus geochromus
 Polydesmus geoffroyi
 Polydesmus germanicus
 Polydesmus glabrum
 Polydesmus goudoti
 Polydesmus gracilipes
 Polydesmus gradjensis
 Polydesmus graecus
 Polydesmus granosus
 Polydesmus granulosus
 Polydesmus grayii
 Polydesmus griseoalbus
 Polydesmus guerinii
 Polydesmus haastii
 Polydesmus hamatus
 Polydesmus haydenianus
 Polydesmus helveticus
 Polydesmus henselii
 Polydesmus herzegowinensis
 Polydesmus herzogowinensis
 Polydesmus hessei
 Polydesmus hochstetteri
 Polydesmus hochstetterii
 Polydesmus hoffmanni
 Polydesmus humberti
 Polydesmus hybridus
 Polydesmus idriensis
 Polydesmus ignoratus
 Polydesmus incisus
 Polydesmus inconstans
 Polydesmus incostans
 Polydesmus innotatum
 Polydesmus insularis
 Polydesmus ionicus
 Polydesmus jalzici
 Polydesmus japonicum
 Polydesmus japonicus
 Polydesmus javanus
 Polydesmus jawlowskii
 Polydesmus juergengruberi
 Polydesmus jugoslavicus
 Polydesmus kelaarti
 Polydesmus klisurensis
 Polydesmus komareki
 Polydesmus kosswigi
 Polydesmus lambranus
 Polydesmus liber
 Polydesmus liberiensis
 Polydesmus lignaui
 Polydesmus longicornis
 Polydesmus luctuosus
 Polydesmus lusitanicus
 Polydesmus lusitanus
 Polydesmus malaccanus
 Polydesmus mammillatus
 Polydesmus margaritaceus
 Polydesmus margaritiferus
 Polydesmus martensii
 Polydesmus mastophorus
 Polydesmus mediterraneus
 Polydesmus melanchthonius
 Polydesmus menicanus
 Polydesmus microcomplanatus
 Polydesmus minutulus
 Polydesmus miyosii
 Polydesmus moluccensis
 Polydesmus moniliaris
 Polydesmus montanus
 Polydesmus monticola
 Polydesmus morantus
 Polydesmus mucronatus
 Polydesmus muralewiczi
 Polydesmus nanus
 Polydesmus nattereri
 Polydesmus nietneri
 Polydesmus niveus
 Polydesmus nodosus
 Polydesmus noricus
 Polydesmus notatus
 Polydesmus ocellatus
 Polydesmus oltenicus
 Polydesmus oniscinus
 Polydesmus orientalis
 Polydesmus ornatus
 Polydesmus panteli
 Polydesmus parmatus
 Polydesmus pectinatus
 Polydesmus pekuensis
 Polydesmus pellicensis
 Polydesmus peloponnesi
 Polydesmus pfeifferae
 Polydesmus phantasma
 Polydesmus picteti
 Polydesmus pictus
 Polydesmus pilipes
 Polydesmus planinensis
 Polydesmus planus
 Polydesmus plataleus
 Polydesmus polonicus
 Polydesmus polygamiae
 Polydesmus progressus
 Polydesmus pseudoedentulus
 Polydesmus pulcher
 Polydesmus punctatus
 Polydesmus python
 Polydesmus raffardi
 Polydesmus rangifer
 Polydesmus rhodopensis
 Polydesmus ribeiraensis
 Polydesmus robiniarum
 Polydesmus rodopensis
 Polydesmus rothi
 Polydesmus roulini
 Polydesmus rubelus
 Polydesmus rubescens
 Polydesmus rupicursor
 Polydesmus sagittarius
 Polydesmus sakalava
 Polydesmus sanctus
 Polydesmus saussurii
 Polydesmus scaber
 Polydesmus schaessburgensis
 Polydesmus schetelyi
 Polydesmus schomburgkii
 Polydesmus sculptus
 Polydesmus scutatus
 Polydesmus semicinctus
 Polydesmus serridens
 Polydesmus skinneri
 Polydesmus spectabilis
 Polydesmus squammatus
 Polydesmus stiphropus
 Polydesmus striganovae
 Polydesmus strongylosomoides
 Polydesmus stummeri
 Polydesmus stuxbergi
 Polydesmus subscabratus
 Polydesmus subulifer
 Polydesmus subvittatus
 Polydesmus sumatranus
 Polydesmus superus
 Polydesmus susatensis
 Polydesmus susensis
 Polydesmus syrensis
 Polydesmus tambanus
 Polydesmus tanakai
 Polydesmus taranus
 Polydesmus tarascus
 Polydesmus tatranus
 Polydesmus tenuis
 Polydesmus testaceus
 Polydesmus thwaitesii
 Polydesmus transsilvanicus
 Polydesmus transsylvanicus
 Polydesmus triacanthos
 Polydesmus tricuspidatus
 Polydesmus tridens
 Polydesmus tripunctatus
 Polydesmus undeviginti
 Polydesmus urvillii
 Polydesmus wardaranus
 Polydesmus varians
 Polydesmus velutinus
 Polydesmus vermiculare
 Polydesmus vicarius
 Polydesmus woodianus
 Polydesmus xanthocrepis
 Polydesmus zebratus
 Polydesmus zelebori
 Polydesmus zonkovi

Gallery

References

Polydesmida